Bomby is a village in Cumbria, England.
Bomby village consists only of one farm house. The farm is mostly known for its specific potatoes, the Kind Edward potato.

Villages in Cumbria
Bampton, Cumbria